The Australasian Raptor Association (ARA) was founded in 1978 as a special interest group of the Royal Australasian Ornithologists Union, also known as Birds Australia. It is now a special interest group of BirdLife Australia. It promotes the study and conservation of the diurnal and nocturnal raptors, sometimes called birds of prey, of Australasia and South-east Asia.  It publishes a journal, Boobook, twice a year.

External links
 Australasian Raptor Association

1978 establishments in Australia
Organizations established in 1978
Ornithological organisations in Australia
Bird conservation organizations
Raptor organizations